The Cathedral of Saints Peter and Paul is a cathedral of the Roman Catholic Church, located in Abeokuta, capital of Ogun State, Nigeria. It is the seat of the Diocese of Abeokuta (Dioecesis Abeokutanus).

Catholicism was introduced to Abeokuta by the Fathers of the Society of African Missions (SMA) around 1880, with the first Mass celebrated on June 29, 1880, the feast day of Saints Peter and Saint Paul. The church was elevated to cathedral status in 1997 when Pope John Paul II created the diocese with the bull Cum ad aeternam.

See also
Catholic Church in Nigeria

References

Roman Catholic cathedrals in Nigeria
Buildings and structures in Abeokuta
Roman Catholic churches completed in 1880
19th-century Roman Catholic church buildings
19th-century religious buildings and structures in Nigeria